Her First Dance is an album by pianist Misha Alperin recorded in 2006 and released on the ECM label.

Reception
The Allmusic review by Thom Jurek awarded the album 4 stars stating "This is a beautiful recording and perhaps, as idiosyncratic as it is, Alperin's finest moment for ECM yet".

Track listing
All compositions by Mikhail Alperin except as indicated
 "Vayan" - 6:12 
 "Her First Dance" - 5:16 
 "A New Day" - 3:23 
 "April in February" - 2:39 
 "Jump" - 3:24 
 "Tiflis" - 6:00 
 "Lonely in White" - 4:28 
 "Frozen Tears" - 5:25 
 "The Russian Song" (Arkady Shilkloper) - 4:31 
 "Via Dolorosa" - 7:21
Recorded at Rainbow Studio in Oslo, Norway in July 2006.

Personnel
Mikhail Alperin — piano
Arkady Shilkloper — French horn, fluegelhorn
Anja Lechner — cello

References

ECM Records albums
Mikhail Alperin albums
2007 albums
Albums produced by Manfred Eicher